is a 2015 Japanese police procedural thriller film based on the Japanese television drama series Unfair. It follows two other films based on the series, Unfair: The Movie (2007) and Unfair 2: The Answer (2011). The film is directed by Shimako Satō, who also directed the previous film, with Ryoko Shinohara reprising her role from the series and films. It was released on September 5, 2015.

Cast
Ryoko Shinohara 
Kento Nagayama
Sadao Abe
Masaya Kato
Akira
Susumu Terajima
Kōichi Satō
Mion Mukaichi

Reception

Box office
On its second weekend it earned  and again placed second by gross revenue. By September 29, it had earned .

References

External links

2010s police procedural films
Japanese thriller films
2010s thriller films
Films directed by Shimako Satō
Films based on television series
Tokyo Metropolitan Police Department in fiction
Japanese sequel films
2010s Japanese films